The men's double sculls competition at the 1948 Summer Olympics in London took place are at Henley Royal Regatta Course on the Henley-on-Thames.

Schedule

Results

Heats
First boat of each heat qualified to the semifinal, remainder goes to the repechage.

Heat 1

Heat 2

Heat 3

Heat 4

Repechage
First boat of each heat qualified to the semifinal.

Heat 1

Heat 2

Heat 3

Semifinal
First boat of each heat qualified to the final.

Heat 1

Heat 2

Heat 3

Final

References

External links
 

Rowing at the 1948 Summer Olympics
Rowing at the 1936 Summer Olympics